Fotsing Norman Arthur Pitoula Wabo (born 6 May 1998) is an English professional footballer who plays as a forward for National League South club Eastbourne Borough.

Club career
Born in Newham, Wabo joined Southend United at the age of 15, after being scouted playing in an Essex county game. Following an impressive loan spell at Southern League side Cambridge City, where he netted four times in five appearances, Wabo signed his first professional deal with Southend, running until 2018, with an option of a further year. After impressing in the under-23 side, Wabo was rewarded with his Football League debut for Southend during their 3–1 away defeat to Scunthorpe United, replacing Simon Cox in the 87th minute.

On 6 March 2018, after appearing twice more for Southend, Wabo was sent out on loan to National League side Ebbsfleet United for the remainder of the season. Just over two weeks later, he made his debut during their 1–1 home draw with Maidenhead United, replacing Dean Rance with seven minutes remaining. Wabo joined Braintree Town on loan in November 2018.

He was released by Southend at the end of the 2018–19 season.

On 2 August 2019, Wabo joined Dartford for the 2019/20 season.

On 6 January 2020, Wabo joined Cheshunt on an initial month's loan.

On 27 October 2020, Wabo joined Margate.

In February 2021, Wabo joined Concord Rangers on a temporary dual-registration loan deal. He made his debut on 13 February 2021 against Eastbourne Borough.

In January 2022, he signed for Isthmian League Premier Division side Bowers & Pitsea on loan from National League South side Billericay Town. In March 2022, he was again sent out on a dual-registration to fellow Isthmian league side Potters Bar Town until the end of the campaign.

Career statistics

References

External links

1998 births
Living people
People from the London Borough of Newham
English footballers
Association football forwards
Southend United F.C. players
Cambridge City F.C. players
Ebbsfleet United F.C. players
Maidstone United F.C. players
Braintree Town F.C. players
Dartford F.C. players
Cheshunt F.C. players
Margate F.C. players
Concord Rangers F.C. players
Billericay Town F.C. players
Bowers & Pitsea F.C. players
Potters Bar Town F.C. players
Eastbourne Borough F.C. players
English Football League players
Southern Football League players
National League (English football) players
Isthmian League players